The comprehensive discography of Wumpscut, a Germany-based electro-industrial artist, consists of eighteen studio albums, seven EPs, thirteen compilation albums, and eighteen singles.

Studio albums

Extended plays

Compilations

Singles

References

Discographies of German artists